Arthur John Thornhill (3 April 1850 – 4 June 1930) was an English Conservative Party politician from Diddington Hall, Buckden, in Huntingdonshire.

Hicks was elected as a Member of Parliament (MP) for Cambridgeshire at a by-election in March 1884 following the elevation to the peerage of Henry Brand. He held the seat until the constituency was divided by the Redistribution of Seats Act 1885.

He was nominated as High Sheriff of Cambridgeshire and Huntingdonshire in 1889, and nominated again in 1892 after which he was appointed to the office in 1893.

References

External links 

1850 births
1930 deaths
Conservative Party (UK) MPs for English constituencies
UK MPs 1880–1885
High Sheriffs of Cambridgeshire and Huntingdonshire
People from Buckden, Cambridgeshire